Yaakov Bender (born 1950) is an American Orthodox rabbi. He is the rosh hayeshiva (dean) of Yeshiva Darchei Torah (Far Rockaway). He was appointed first as a seventh-grade rebbi (Hebrew teacher) in 1978 and less than a year later as principal. The school's enrollment has grown since then and now exceeds 2,500. Bender is a speaker, writer and adviser on Jewish education.

He is an active member of the Vaad Roshei Yeshiva - the governing rabbinic board - of Torah Umesorah – National Society for Hebrew Day Schools.

His parents, Rabbi Dovid and Basya Bender, were pioneering educators on the American Jewish scene. His paternal grandfather, Rabbi Avraham Bender, traveled in the 1930s within the United States to raise funds for yeshivas in New York and Israel.

COVID-19 vaccination advocacy 
Bender encouraged people to get the COVID-19 vaccine, saying "We haven't lived through enough?"

Works
 Rav Yaakov Bender on Chumash
 Chinuch for Today
 Chinuch With Heart
 Chinuch With Chessed
 The Chinuch Haggadah

References

1950 births
Living people
American Orthodox rabbis
20th-century American rabbis
21st-century American rabbis
Place of birth missing (living people)